Lan ETS is a yearly LAN party event held by a student club of the same name from the École de technologie supérieure university in Montreal. It is currently the largest LAN party in Canada and on North America East Coast. In 2013, approximately 1094 gamers attended the event for a chance to win over $18,000 in money and over $25,000 in prizes.

Activity
Born from three university students' passion for network gaming, information technologies and the search for new challenges, the Lan ETS is the largest event in the field of network gaming in Canada. The main attraction of Lan ETS is its famous video game competitions that offer participants the chance to win more than $40,000 in money and over $25,000 in prizes each year. The official tournament's line-up usually includes an FPS, an RTS and a DotA-like.

Each year a diverse and dynamic clientele visits the Lan ETS. Participants are primarily from Québec, but also from Ontario and the northeastern United States. Lan ETS also receives many visitors from the Montreal area who enjoy the various activities accessible to everyone such as the "Scavenger Hunt", Consoles, Cosplay contest, Video Game Orchestra and more!

2022
Lan ETS 2022 was the 20th edition staged by our student club. For the occasion, the organization team decided to come back at his original venue, the university École de technologie supérieure. The event was held for 48 hours as usual, opening at 6pm on friday and closing up around 6pm sunday. The tickets were sold very rapidly, the first wave was sold-out in 13 minutes and the second in 8 minutes. The hype around the event was very high after those 2 years of pandemic without events of this sort. The total prize pool was $25,000 the tournaments.

BYOC participants were able to choose between four PC tournaments ( League of Legends $6,500, Counter Strike: Global Offensive $4,500, Rocket League $2,500 and Valorant $4,500 ) and four console tournaments (Super Street Fighter IV $250, Super Smash Bros Melee $500, Super Smash Bros. Ultimate $1000 and Guilty Gear Strive 250$ ).

Many sponsors help the event and were happy to have a booth after those eventless 2 years. Notable sponsors/partners include Bell, Redbull, Fury, AEETS, HyperX, WRBuilds, Loto-Québec and Académie Esports de Montréal.

Lan ETS 2022 was the 20th edition of the Lan that people really appreciated even if the scale was smaller than previous years. The friday night was special because at midnight it was the end of the mandatory mask in public place.  It showed how hype people were to meet each other and participate in a community event after those hard 2 years. While streaming on "BellCanada" twitch channel, the Lan ETS made 52 hours streamed, 3 200 hours watched, 276 peak viewers and 7 different games streamed.

2021
Lan ETS 2021 was the 19th event staged by the organization. Unfortunately due to the Covid-19 Pandemic, the event as we know it, didn't take place. Even facing with this challenge, the team decided to find a solution to do that classic event. The team decided to make the event on live-stream, which lasted 4 weeks of animations, streamer showcases, video games tournaments and more.

Those 4 weeks permitted a lot more tournaments and events than usual. Gamers were able to choose between different PC tournaments (Counter Strike: Global Offensive, Fortnite, League of Legends,Valorant and more) and console tournaments (NHL 20,Super Smash Bros. Melee, Super Smash Bros. Ultimate and more ).

Many sponsors helped with the event even though there was no booth possible. Notable sponsors/partners include Bell, Redbull, MSI, HyperX and Bestar.

Lan ETS 2021 was an edition of the Lan, that proved how resilient when facing hard times.  It also showed of innovative it can be with this one of a kind 4 weeks of live-streaming. While streaming on "BellCanada" twitch channel, the Lan ETS made 30 104 Live Views, 19 964 Unique Viewers and 1 507 New Followers.

2013
Lan ETS 2013 was the 11th event staged by the organization and the expectations were high after the successful 10th anniversary the previous year. With over 1094 tickets sold, $17,500 on tournaments prizes and over $25,000 in material prizes, it was the largest Lan Party event ever held by the Lan ETS organization. The enthusiasm surrounding the event was very high, with the last 300 tickets sold in less than 20 minutes.

Gamers were able to choose between five PC tournaments (League of Legends $7,500, Counter Strike: Global Offensive $3,500, StarCraft 2 $3,000, DOTA 2 $2,000 and Team Fortress 2) and two console tournaments (Super Street Fighter IV $750 and NHL13 $750).

Many sponsors were on-site with booths including Plantronics Gamecom, Corsair, CoolerMaster, CIPC and ASUS. Other notable sponsors/partners include Vidéotron, Cisco, Riot Games, TP, Bawls and Twitch.

Lan ETS 2013 was home of new experience for the attendees including a high-quality Twitch broadcast both in French and English, registering over 110,000 views in 48 hours. In addition, the StarCraft 2 and League of legends finals were played live on stage in a 300 seats auditorium.

2012
Lan ETS celebrated its tenth anniversary in 2012 with the tenth event by the organization, the Lan ETS 2012. It was the biggest event ever staged by the organization.

With more than 900 seats and $15,000 in tournament prizes, the Lan ETS 2012 established a new record in attendance for a Lan Party in Canada. The event was sold-out in less than two weeks and the official website displayed more than 500,000 unique pages over a two-month period.

The newest tournament, League of Legends, attracted more than 250 players from around North America to become the most important tournament in terms of contestants during the Lan ETS 2012. The event also held a tournament for Counter Strike: Source with more than 150 players and a StarCraft 2 tournament with over 100 players. An NHL 2012 tournament was also happening in the "Lounge" section.

Many sponsors were available during the event with booths to present their products. Corsair, ASUS, Plantronics, Cooler Master and CIPC were amongst the ones to be live at the event. They have given thousands of dollars in prizes to the participants over the years. The Internet connection, with a dedicated 5 Gbit/s speed, was provided by Videotron.

Activities were going on during the entire weekend, including the famous Scavenger Hunt, a contest where players complete various stunts related to geek culture for points. Also, various activities were organized with the sponsors to win material prizes (keyboards, gaming mice, headsets and more).

Past events

Executive team

Notes

École de technologie supérieure